Mozawa Dam is an earthfill dam located in Gunma Prefecture in Japan. The dam is used for flood control. The catchment area of the dam is 1.8 km2. The dam impounds about 3  ha of land when full and can store 173 thousand cubic meters of water. The construction of the dam was started on 1971 and completed in 1977.

References

Dams in Gunma Prefecture